Bizhgan may refer to:
 Bizhgan, Chaharmahal and Bakhtiari
 Bizhgan, Kohgiluyeh and Boyer-Ahmad